VI Airlink (or Virgin Islands Airlink) is an airline from the British Virgin Islands, with its license issued under the British Overseas Territory's air requirements. It is the only Airline with airplanes registered in the B.V.I. It operates mostly chartered short-haul flights throughout the Caribbean from its base at Terrance B. Lettsome International Airport on Beef Island, using a fleet of three aircraft (a Beechcraft 1900 (VP-LVI) Beechcraft King Air (VP-LNB) and a Cessna 402 (VP-LAD)).

Scheduled services to Anegada are offered four times a week, from Beef Island/ Tortola connections from St. Thomas. Schedule service to Antigua twice a week Friday and Saturday. In 2009, the airline applied with the Federal Aviation Administration for the allowance to launch flights to San Juan, Puerto Rico, and is still awaiting final approval.

VI Airlink is engaged in the medical emergency transport of the British Virgin Islands, with its airplanes being convertible accordingly.

In 2012 the airline was approved by the United States Federal Aviation Administration to fly directly to the United States, the first overseas territory carrier to gain access since 1993.

In mid-2015 it is expected that VI Airlink will establish a to/from flight service between the British Virgin Island's Beef Island near Tortola and the West Indies island Antigua. Currently, flights to the British Virgin Islands is only available in small planes and regional services, this cross-country flight system will greatly affect travel to the islands.

References

http://www.bvitalktourism.com/tag/vi-airlink/
http://www.bvitourism.com/inter-island-aviation
http://www.bvihotpress.com/community/item/3124-vi-air-link-to-fly-bvi/san-juan-route-daily.html

External links
Official website

Airlines of the British Virgin Islands